Yadiel is a given name. Notable people with the name include: 

Yadiel Hernández (born 1987), Cuban baseball player
Yadiel Rivera (born 1992), Puerto Rican baseball player

See also
Yadier

Masculine given names